Lobotomia is a Brazilian crossover thrash band from São Paulo.

Bio
Lobotomia was created in 1984, characterized by hardcore songs. Its original formation was Caio on vocals, Adherbal Billy Argel on guitars, Grego on drums and Alfredo on bass.

Punk movement was on the rise and places like Napalm, Carbono 14, Lira Paulistana, Madame Satã, Ácido Plástico and others were welcoming bands of this kind.

At the end of 1985, Lobotomia was part of the Ataque Sonoro compilation by the independent label Ataque Frontal and the change in the band's musical style is already visible on this album, in search for a new sonority and the starting fusion with other heavy sound styles. Along with the bands Cólera, Garotos Podres, Ratos de Porão, Armagedom, Vírus 27, Grinders, Desordeiros and Auschwitz.

In 1986, with Caio on vocals, Adherbal on guitars, Grego on drums and Zezé on bass they got ready to record what was going to be the first Brazilian “metalpunk” record, the style that later would lead to what is known today as crossover.

The vinyl LP - Lobotomia - was recorded and produced by the band while New Face Records collaborated with pressing and distribution in 1987. This album has a characteristic metallic, dark and innovative sound that was different from everything that was heard in terms of punk in Brazil until then. This work includes the rerecording of Faces da Morte and also the band's classics like Só Os Mortos Não Reclamam and Indigentes do Amanhã, with lyrics by Adherbal and Caio.

This record was remarkable because even though it was a heavy and completely out of the 80's market standards, one of its songs, “Só Os Mortos Não Reclamam”, was on the regular schedule of the 89 FM radio station, which was entitled Radio Rock. At the time, it was inconceivable to play this musical genre on the radio, especially if the station had a more alternative profile.

In this phase, Lobotomia went through another change. For the live concerts, they called Paulo, who was friends with the vocalist Caio, to take a place on the second guitar. With this formation they played many concerts in the São Paulo underground.

In 1988, Zezé and Caio quit the band and gave room to Flavinho on bass and Guba on vocals. Most of the next album songs were written at this phase, with three of the lyrics being written by Guba. When Guba left, Markon took up the vocals, and with this formation they entered a studio in Belo Horizonte and recorded in 1989, by the label Cogumelo Discos, the LP Nada É Como Parece. The band's sound got more cohesive by mixing styles, sounding closer to heavy metal bands but still not being regarded as crossover. By the end of the recordings the band came full circle and temporarily ceased their activities after a few more concerts.

In 2002, the band (Markon, Adherbal, Paulo, Grego and Picapau) reunited for a concert with Agnostic Front.

In 2003, the first album's CD “Lobotomia” is relaunched in Japan by the record company SpeedStates.

In 2004 the band returns to action but now with only one member of the original formation: the drummer Grego. The guitarist is Jozé (ex- Kangaroos In Tilt), bassist Fralda (ex-Ratos de Porão) and Markon on vocals. Many concerts were made around the country in Brazil with this formation.
With the departure of Zé, the band returns to the Nada É Como Parece formation, with the exception of Flavinho, who was substituted by Fralda, who later would be replaced by Carlos “Carlinhos”.
In January 2008 Grego, Adherbal, Paulo, Markon and Carlos entered the studio to record one more album called Extinção, with 13 songs that combine several styles shifting between hardcore, punk and thrash metal.

After the recording, Adherbal and Paulo quit the band again and Carlos changes focus to his band “Presto?”.

In 2009 Fralda returns to the band, André (Presto?) assumes the guitars and the band played a few more concerts to spread the new album Extinção.
In July 2009, with the formation Grego, Markon, Fralda and André, Lobotomia finally leave the country for their first European tour.

In 2011 is the band's second European tour, longer and visiting more countries.

Right after the second tour Markon leaves the band along with the guitarist Spock. Guilherme Goto joins the band at only 15 years old and assumes the guitars. Edu Vudoo joins as the new vocalist. In 2013 Fralda also leaves the band and is substituted by Gabriel Kaspar, that in 2015 is replaced by Daniel Brita (Pig Soul and Mão Santa).

With the new formation of Edu Vudoo, Guilherme Goto, Daniel Brita and Grego, Lobotomia records the fourth album “Desastre”, acclaimed by the critics and the fans right after being released, in 2016. Still in 2015, right after the recordings of the new album the band toured Europe for the third time. In 2016 the album has a disclosure tour in Brazil and an unprecedented tour of Mexico. The tour involves 14 concerts in 12 cities and surprises the band with the number of fans and welcome.

The band is currently already preparing and working on new material and setting a new European tour for 2018.

Lobotomia is a hardcore/crossover thrash band that left a mark on the 80's and today is still a reference for many bands who follow this style.

LAST FORMATION:
¥    Edu Vudoo - vocals
¥    Guilherme Goto - guitar
¥    Daniel Brita - bass
¥    Grego - drums
Discography
Release date	Release name	Media
2016	Desastre	CD
2009	Extinção	CD
1989	Nada é Como Parece	LP
1987	Independência ou Morte	
1986	Lobotomia	LP
1985	Ataque Sonoro

Current Line Up
 Eduardo Vudoo (vocals)
 Guilherme Gotto (guitars)
 Daniel Brita (bass)
 Grego (drums)

Discography

Studio albums
 Lobotomia (1986)
 Nada É Como Parece (1989)
 Extinção (2009)
 Desastre (2016)

Demos
 1984 demo (1984)

References
Lobotomia at Encyclopedia Metallum

External links
  Lobotomia at Kill From The Heart
 Facebook Page

Brazilian hardcore punk groups
Crossover thrash groups
Musical groups established in 1984
Brazilian thrash metal musical groups
Musical quartets
1984 establishments in Brazil
Musical groups disestablished in 1991
1991 establishments in Brazil
Musical groups reestablished in 2004